Rustenburg is a village in the Dutch province of North Holland. It is a part of the municipality of Koggenland, and lies about 5 km southeast of Heerhugowaard.

The village was first mentioned in 1573 as Rustenburch, and means "quiet castle". It may have been a name of an inn. Rustenburg was home to 167 people in 1840. There are three wind mills in Rustenburg.

Gallery

References

Populated places in North Holland
Koggenland